Charles Street is a street in the Mayfair district of the City of Westminster, London.

Location
Charles Street runs roughly north-east from Waverton Street in the west to Berkeley Square in the east, bending slightly northward halfway along. The southwestern end is narrower.

History
The street is named after a member of the Berkeley family, and was built when Lord Berkeley's estate was developed. Most properties along the street were constructed between about 1745 and 1750, chiefly by carpenter John Phillips. Many of them are now listed by Historic England.

Inhabitants

Archibald Primrose, 5th Earl of Rosebery, British prime minister, was born in his father's house at 20 Charles Street in 1847.
Claude Watney lived at 20 Charles Street in the early 1900s.

Listed buildings
2 Charles Street, a three-storey house, was built in the eighteenth century. It has been listed as Grade II by English Heritage since 1 December 1987.
6 Charles Street, a four-storey terrace house with Doric columns on the porch, was built circa 1753. It has been listed as Grade II by English Heritage since 9 January 1970.
7 Charles Street is a five-storey house built with Portland stone. It has been listed as Grade II since 1 December 1987.
8 Charles Street is a four-storey house built circa 1753. It has been listed as Grade II since 1 December 1987.
17 Charles Street, a five-storey terrace house, was built circa 1753. It has been listed as Grade II by English Heritage since 9 January 1970.
18 Charles Street, a four-storey terrace house, was built circa 1753. It has been listed as Grade II by English Heritage since 9 January 1970.
18a Charles Street, a four-storey terrace house on the corner of Charles Street and Chesterfield Hill, was built from 1750 to 1753. It has been listed as Grade II by English Heritage since 1 December 1987.
18b, 19a and 19 Charles Street, four-storey houses built with Bath stone, were built circa 1900. They have been listed as Grade II by English Heritage since 1 December 1987.
20, Charles Street, a three-storey terrace house, was built from 1750 to 1753. It has been listed as Grade II by English Heritage since 9 January 1970.
21 Charles Street, a three-storey terrace house, was built from 1750 to 1753. It has been listed as Grade II by English Heritage since 23 December 1969.
22 Charles Street, a three-storey terrace house, was built circa 1753 by William Timbrell and John Phillips. It has been listed as Grade II* by English Heritage since 9 January 1970.
23 Charles Street, a four-storey terrace house, was built circa 1753. It has been listed as Grade II by English Heritage since 1 December 1987.
25, 26 and 27 Charles Street, three four-storey terrace houses, were built circa 1753. They have been listed as Grade II by English Heritage since 9 January 1970.
27a Charles Street, a three-storey terrace house on the corner of Charles Street and Waverton Street, was built in the late eighteenth century. It has been listed as Grade II by English Heritage since 9 January 1970.
28 Charles Street, also known as Crewe House, is a detached mansion built by Edward Shepherd in 1730. It has been listed as Grade II* since 24 February 1958.
29 Charles Street, a four-storey terrace house, was built from 1710 to 1753. It has been listed as Grade II by English Heritage since 24 February 1958.
37 and 38 Charles Street were combined from two separate houses into a grand mansion in 1890. It has been listed as Grade II* by English Heritage since 1 December 1987.
39 Charles Street, a three-storey terrace house, was built from 1750 to 1753. It has been listed as Grade II* since 24 February 1958.
40 Charles Street, a four-storey terrace house, was built from 1750 to 1753 by John Phillips and George Shakespear. It has been listed as Grade II* since 24 February 1958.
41 Charles Street, a three-storey terrace house, was built from 1750 to 1753 by John Phillips and George Shakespear. It has been listed as Grade II* since 24 February 1958.
48 Charles Street, a four-storey terrace house, was built from 1750 to 1753 by John Phillips and George Shakespear. It has been listed as Grade II since 24 February 1958.
50 Charles Street, a three-storey terrace house, was built from 1751 to 1752 by John Phillips and George Shakespear. It has been listed as Grade II by English Heritage since 1 December 1987.
51 Charles Street, a four-storey house, was built in the mid-19th century. It has been listed as Grade II by English Heritage since  3 October 2000.
52 and 52a Charles Street, a four-storey house on the corner of Charles Street and Berkeley Square, was built from 1750 to 1770. It has been listed as Grade II by English Heritage since 24 February 1958.

See also
The Only Running Footman
Mark's Club
Cosmopolitan Club (London)

References
Citations

Sources

External links

Streets in the City of Westminster
Mayfair